Jussi lakes are six lakes in Kuusalu Parish, Harju County, Estonia. The lakes are located in Põhja-Kõrvemaa Nature Reserve.

These lakes are:
 Kõverjärv
 Linajärv 
 Mustjärv (2,1 ha)
 Pikkjärv
 Suurjärv 
 Veinjärv (5,9 ha).

See also
 List of lakes of Estonia

References

Kuusalu Parish
Lakes of Harju County